The 1947 Scottish Cup Final was played on 19 April 1947, at Hampden Park in Glasgow. The match was contested by Aberdeen and Hibernian, with Aberdeen winning 2–1. This was Aberdeen's first Scottish Cup victory.

Match details

References

1947
Cup Final
Scottish Cup Final 1947
Scottish Cup Final 1947
1940s in Glasgow
April 1947 sports events in the United Kingdom